The following is a list of top scorers in Allsvenskan, the highest Swedish division of football.

List

References

Allsvenskan top scorers
Sweden
Association football player non-biographical articles